Sergio Oscar Almirón (born 20 September 1985) is an Argentine footballer who plays as a forward for Torneo Descentralizado side UTC.

Career

Club
Almirón has played football in Paraguay, Chile, Peru, Argentina, Bolivia and Colombia during his career. He began in Paraguay with 12 de Octubre in 2006, before spells with Provincial Osorno, Colegio Nacional Iquitos and Newell's Old Boys in Chile, Peru and Argentina respectively before returning to Paraguay to join Olimpia in 2011 where he won the 2011 Paraguayan Primera División Clausura. Between 2012 and 2013, Almirón played for León de Huánuco and José Gálvez FBC in the Peruvian Primera División and made a total of 32 appearances and scored 11 goals.

2014 saw Almirón enter Bolivian football for the first time as he joined Liga de Fútbol Profesional Boliviano team Blooming. After two campaigns with Blooming and 24 goals in 57 games, Almirón left the club to join fellow top-flight Bolivian side Oriente Petrolero. He scored 21 goals in 38 matches for Oriente Petrolero. In September 2016, Almirón joined Argentine Primera División team Atlético de Rafaela. However, after just three appearances in 2016–17 he left at the end of 2016 and subsequently went to Categoría Primera A side Atlético Huila in Colombia in 2017.

Career statistics

Club
.

Honours

Club
Olimpia
Paraguayan Primera División (1) 2011 Clausura

References

External links
 Argentine Primera statistics  
 
 BDFA profile 

1985 births
Living people
Argentine footballers
Association football forwards
Argentine expatriate footballers
Argentine expatriate sportspeople in Chile
Argentine expatriate sportspeople in Paraguay
Argentine expatriate sportspeople in Peru
Argentine expatriate sportspeople in Bolivia
Argentine expatriate sportspeople in Colombia
Expatriate footballers in Chile
Expatriate footballers in Peru
Expatriate footballers in Paraguay
Expatriate footballers in Bolivia
Expatriate footballers in Colombia
Expatriate footballers in Venezuela
12 de Octubre Football Club players
Provincial Osorno footballers
Colegio Nacional Iquitos footballers
Newell's Old Boys footballers
Club Olimpia footballers
León de Huánuco footballers
José Gálvez FBC footballers
Club Blooming players
Oriente Petrolero players
Atlético de Rafaela footballers
Atlético Huila footballers
Primera B de Chile players
Argentine Primera División players
Peruvian Primera División players
Paraguayan Primera División players
Categoría Primera A players
Bolivian Primera División players
Ontinyent CF players
Segunda División B players
Universidad Técnica de Cajamarca footballers
Venezuelan Primera División players
Deportivo Táchira F.C. players
People from San Nicolás de los Arroyos
Sportspeople from Buenos Aires Province